St Joseph's College is a mixed grammar school located in Trent Vale, Stoke on Trent, Staffordshire. The school's oldest and original building in this location is a Grade II listed structure which was previously a residential property before it was bought by the Christian Brothers in 1931.

History

The school was founded by the Christian Brothers in 1932.
It moved into the present buildings in 1936, and was recognised by the Board of Education in the following year.

St Joseph's was a direct grant grammar school until the 11-plus was abolished in Stoke in 1967, after which the grant was gradually phased out. The school re-opened as a fully independent school in 1980, and in the following years began to admit girls.
In the early 1980s the school pulled out of the Catholic reorganisation of secondary provision and decided to stay private. When grant maintained schools were allowed it started to admit non-fee paying pupils. 
It is the only grammar school in the area as the council abolished the grammar system but as a private school it was allowed to continue.

After many years as a Preparatory and Senior School, the Preparatory School split off to form a new independent school elsewhere on the site, while the High School became a state-maintained grammar school. The school achieved Science College status in 2004. It is no longer a grammar-school however students must sit an entrance exam.

Applicants to the school are required to take an entrance examination. Approximately 75% of applicants reach the school's qualifying standard, and places are allocated among these using other criteria (faith, siblings and distance). St Joseph's has Specialist Status for Science and Mathematics and is rated as Outstanding in all areas by Ofsted. The college was amongst the first schools to convert to Academy status in 2011 and in 2012 became one of the country's first Teaching Schools.

School site

The school has an extensive program of rooms and labs, the biggest are SC2 and SC6 in the Science Wing. A new Science Wing was added to the old building, forming a quadrangle in the centre of the school, which contains a heart-shaped pond overlooked by a statue of the Virgin Mary, marking the end of the second millennium. A statue of Edmund Rice is located outside the Year 7 corridor.

The Sixth Form Centre until 2008 was housed separately from the rest of the school in a Grade II listed building, which until 2001 was home to the Congregation of Christian Brothers who founded the school. Since their departure from the school premises in the summer of 2001, the Brothers' House has undergone extensive renovations.

From September 2008 onwards, 'Stone House' further down the A34 road towards Hanford took the Brother's House's place as Sixth Form Centre.

In 2018 Stone House was sold and the Sixth Form Centre was relocated to the 'Fideliter Building' - a chapel across the road from the main school site with a recent extension added - and the 'Olsen Building'. The Olsen Building is on the main school site and was built for use by Sixth Form students.

In 2019 a perimeter fence and gate system was built around the school site.

School song: Fideliter et Fortiter
Originally, there was two extra verse in the song:

When we grow old and the battle is raging,
when to the wide earth's far corners we're flung;
when we need faith in the conflict we're waging;
shall we remember how once we were young.

Fideliter et Fortiter, Fideliter et Fortiter,
Down the years we'll re-echo the song:
Faithful and strong. Faithful and strong.

Then we'll be true to devotions we've learnéd,
cling to our standards, be proud of our name.
Bear without hauteur the laurels we've earnéd,
strong in adversity, humble in fame.

Fideliter et Fortiter, Fideliter et Fortiter,
Down the years we'll re-echo the song:
Faithful and strong. Faithful and strong.

Notable former pupils

 Dominic Cork, England cricketer
 Dan Croll, singer-songwriter
 Kian Emadi, medalist in cycling at the 2014 Commonwealth Games
 Terry Green (born 1951), British businessman
 Emma Jackson, England 800m runner
 Archbishop Kevin McDonald, Archbishop of Southwark
 Harry McKirdy, footballer
 Geoffrey Prime, British former spy, convicted of espionage and child sexual abuse
 Ciaran Algar, Award-winning folk musician.

References

External links
 St. Joseph's Preparatory School (3–11) website
 St Joseph's College website

Educational institutions established in 1932
Grammar schools in Stoke-on-Trent
Academies in Stoke-on-Trent
Grade II listed buildings in Staffordshire
1932 establishments in England

Catholic secondary schools in the Archdiocese of Birmingham
Congregation of Christian Brothers secondary schools